Michele Parrinello (born 7 September 1945, Messina) is an Italian physicist particularly known for his work in molecular dynamics (the computer simulation of physical movements of atoms and molecules). Parrinello and Roberto Car were awarded the Dirac Medal and the Sidney Fernbach Award in 2009 for their continuing development of the Car–Parrinello method, first proposed in their seminal 1985 paper, "Unified Approach for Molecular Dynamics and Density-Functional Theory". They have continued to receive awards for this breakthrough, most recently the Dreyfus Prize in the Chemical Sciences and the 2020 Benjamin Franklin Medal in Chemistry.

Parrinello also co-authored highly cited publications on "polymorphic transitions in single crystals" and "canonical sampling through velocity rescaling."

Life and career
Michele Parrinello was born in Messina (Sicily) and received his Laurea in physics from the University of Bologna in 1968. After working at the International School for Advanced Studies in Trieste, the IBM research laboratory in Zurich, and the Max Planck Institute for Solid State Research in Stuttgart, he was appointed Professor of Computational Science at the Swiss Federal Institute of Technology Zurich in 2001, a position he also holds at the Università della Svizzera italiana in Lugano. In 2004 he was elected to Great Britain's Royal Society. In 2011 he was awarded the Marcel Benoist Prize. In 2020 he received the Benjamin Franklin Medal (Franklin Institute) in Chemistry. He has received over 100,000 scientific citations and has an h-index of 152, which is one of the highest among all scientists.

Selected notable contributions
 Car–Parrinello molecular dynamics (the original paper on this is now the 5th most highly cited paper in Physical Review Letters)
 Parrinello–Rahman algorithm
 Flying ice cube
 Metadynamics

References

Further reading
Andreoni, W.; Marx, D.; Sprik, M. (2005). "Editorial: a tribute to Michele Parrinello: from physics via chemistry to biology", ChemPhysChem, Volume 6, Issue 9 (Special Issue: Parrinello Festschrift)
Car, R. and Parrinello, M. (1985). "Unified Approach for Molecular Dynamics and Density-Functional Theory" Physical Review Letters, Vol. 55, Issue 22
Kühne, T. D.; Krack, M.; Mohamed, F. R. and Parrinello, M. (2007). "Efficient and Accurate Car-Parrinello-like Approach to Born-Oppenheimer Molecular Dynamics" Physical Review Letters, Vol. 98, 066401

External links
 Parrinello Research Group at ETH Zürich.

1945 births
Living people
20th-century Italian physicists
Italian expatriates in Switzerland
Scientists from Messina
Fellows of the American Academy of Arts and Sciences
Foreign Members of the Royal Society
Foreign associates of the National Academy of Sciences
Academic staff of the University of Lugano
Schrödinger Medal recipients
Computational chemists
Computational physicists
21st-century Italian physicists
Academic staff of ETH Zurich
Fellows of the American Physical Society